This is the discography and videography of American rock band The B-52's.

Albums

Studio albums

Compilation albums

Live albums

Extended plays

Singles

Other appearances

Video

Music videos

Video albums
 The B-52's 1979–1989 (1989) VHS. (Certified Platinum by RIAA)
 The B-52's Time Capsule: Videos for a Future Generation 1979–1998 (1998) VHS & Laserdisc.
 With the Wild Crowd! Live in Athens, GA (2012) DVD & Blu-ray.

References

Discography
Discographies of American artists
Rock music group discographies
Pop music group discographies
New wave discographies